Octopoteuthis is a genus of squid. It is one of two genera in the family Octopoteuthidae, the other being Taningia. Both Octopoteuthis and Taningia are characterized by their lack of tentacles for the majority of their life cycle, and have traits characteristic of both squids and octopods. The species limits of the genus are in need of further research, for example some authorities have stated that the Mediterranean species Octopoteuthis sicula is apparently the senior synonym of Octopoteuthis danae and that it is very closely related to, or possibly conspecific with, Octopoteuthis megaptera.

Species
The following species are recognised by the World Register of Marine Species:

Octopoteuthis danae Joubin, 1931
Octopoteuthis deletron Young, 1972
Octopoteuthis indica Naef, 1923
Octopoteuthis longiptera * Akimushkin, 1963
Octopoteuthis megaptera (Verrill, 1885)
Octopoteuthis nielseni Robson, 1948
Octopoteuthis rugosa Clarke, 1980
Octopoteuthis sicula Rüppell, 1844, Ruppell's octopus squid

Species marked with an asterisk (*) is a nomen dubium and may not be a valid taxon

References

Squid
Bioluminescent molluscs